Mumbai CSMT–Howrah AC Duronto Express is a Duronto Express train operating on the Mumbai–Howrah route.

Background 
Being the non-stop version of the Duronto train, it used to take the fewest intermediate stops for operational and technical purposes such as crew change, locomotive change, food pick-up, and water-filling. Later, most of operational (technical) stops were made commercial stops and stopagges are given in some state capitals and some state capitals are still non - stopping places.

Rake sharing 
Rake sharing is done with Howrah - Pune AC Duronto Express (12222/12221), Howrah - Yesvantpur AC SF Express (22863/22864), Santragachi - MGR Chennai Central AC SF Express (22807/22808), with a total of five Rakes primarily maintained at Santragachi Coaching Depot.

Coach composition

12262 is the reverse composition of the above 12261.

B- Three Tier AC Sleeper/Third AC, A- Two Tier AC Sleeper/Second AC, H- AC First class cabins/First AC, PC-Pantry/Hot buffet car, EOG/GV-Generator van cum Guard van

Locomotive
It previously ran with WAP-4 loco of Howrah but now mostly gets WAP-7 loco of Santragachi.

Speed
All its coaches are air conditioned LHB coach, capable of reaching 160 kmph.  There is some confusing because according to Indian Railways Permanent Way Manual (IRPWM) on the Indian Railways website or Indian Railway Institute of Civil Engineering website, the BG (Broad Gauge) lines have been classified into six groups ‘A’ to ‘E’ on the basis of the future maximum permissible speeds but it may not be same as current speed.

The maximum permissible speed is 130 km/h but it is less in many parts of the journey as many parts are not fit for 130 km/h speed. The maximum permissible speed is 105 km/h between Mumbai CSMT and Kasara where increasing up to 110 kmph in future is planned, 60 km/h between Kasara and Igatpuri, 110 km/h between Igatpuri and Wardha, 120 kmph between Wardha and Nagpur , 130 km/h  in Nagpur - Durg route, 110 km/h in Durg - Jharsuguda, a part of Nagpur  - Jharsuguda route but the speed in this part is under process to be increased to 130 kmph, 130 km/h  in Jharsuguda - Tatanagar - Kharagpur - Andul route, 110 km/h between Andul and Howrah.

Time Table

From Chhatrapati Shivaji Maharaj Terminus to Howrah - 12261. The train starts from Chhatrapati Shivaji Maharaj Terminus every Sunday, Tuesday, Wednesday & Thursday.

From Howrah to Chhatrapati Shivaji Maharaj Terminus - 12262. The train starts from Bhubaneswar every Monday, Tuesday, Wednesday & Friday.

Technical (operational) halts

12262 has technical halt at  if situation is normal and no halt at Kasara.

References

Trains from Howrah Junction railway station
Transport in Mumbai
Rail transport in Howrah
Duronto Express trains
Rail transport in Maharashtra
Rail transport in West Bengal
Rail transport in Chhattisgarh
Rail transport in Jharkhand
Railway services introduced in 2009
Chhatrapati Shivaji Terminus